Kacie Kinzer  (born 1983) is an American designer and interactive artist. Her best known works are a series of cardboard "tweenbots", which were designed to get help from people, in order to complete their mission: crossing Washington Square Park.  The bots were  collected by the Museum of Modern Art and part of an exhibit on Design and Communication during 2011.  Kinzer spoke at PopTech in 2009.

As of 2017, Kinzer founded and works for the design firm TKOH in New York.

References

External links 

American designers
Interactive art
21st-century American women artists
21st-century American artists
1983 births
Living people